Betta channoides is a species of betta endemic to the island of Borneo in Indonesia, where it is only found in the province of Kalimantan Timur. It is an inhabitant of the shallows of acidic brown-water forest streams.

References

channoides
Taxa named by Maurice Kottelat
Fish described in 1994